"Yeh Ladka Haye Allah" (Hindi: ये लडका हाय अल्लाह, "This Boy Oh God!") is an Indian Hindi song from the 1977 Bollywood film Hum Kisise Kum Naheen. It was sung by Asha Bhosle and Mohammad Rafi. The song was picturized on Rishi Kapoor and Kajal Kiran. It was written by Majrooh Sultanpuri and composed by R. D. Burman. It has been remixed and sampled by many other artists.

The song was a hit in the 1970s, and gained cult status in India. In 2020, Asha Bhosle named this song as one of her most favourite songs.

Reviews 
Indian newspaper The Print praised the score of Hum Kisise Kum Naheen. They praised the composition of all the songs, including "Yeh Ladka Haye Allah". Director Nasir Hussain has been credited as the mastermind of making such soulful songs.

Cultural Impact
In 2019, actress Madhuri Dixit sang this song in the dancing reality show Dance Deewane.

In 2021, the song was performed by Dheeraj Dhoopar and Shraddha Arya in the serial Kundali Bhagya.

Versions
This song has been remade and re-sung by many artists including Jassi Gill, Vishakha Mahore.

In 2018, Indian singer Visakha Mahore has sung a rehashed version of it. Bhojpuri actress Rani Chatterjee featured in the song.

References

External links
 Watch the song.

1977 songs
Indian songs
Hindi film songs
Songs with music by R. D. Burman
Asha Bhosle songs
Mohammed Rafi songs